Tlou Segolela (born 1 March 1988) is a South African association football midfielder who played as a right-winger.

Segolela was born in Moletjie near Polokwane, Transvaal, and has been nicknamed "Gautrain" and "Riya Vaya", which means "here we go", by fans in recognition of his speed.

He was the part of Orlando pirates team which won Double-Treble titles in two successive seasons (2011–12 & 2010–11), which include two league titles. His most notable contribution was a famous corner kick which resulted in a goal by Isaac Chansa just outside the box in the 85th minute, on the last game-day of the season. Pirates were deadlocked at 1–1 against Arrows at the time, and needed a goal to win the League title for the first time in 7 years. As a result of Chansa's goal, the full-time score was 2–1 to Pirates.

Tlou Segolela collected the Goal of the season award for one he scored against Free States Stars in the Botchabelo Stadium. Taking the ball just inside his own half and without support from teammates, he defeated 4 to 5 defenders. The FS Stars keeper came out of his line and Segolela scored past the keeper. That goal was compared to Maradona's one in 1986 FIFA world cup in Mexico, because of its similarities.

International career
He made his debut for South Africa in 2010 and has so far been capped four times scoring twice

International goals
Scores and results list South Africa's goal tally first.

External links

1988 births
South African soccer players
South Africa international soccer players
Living people
Orlando Pirates F.C. players
Association football midfielders
People from Polokwane
Bloemfontein Celtic F.C. players
Sportspeople from Limpopo